Henry Clay McCormick (June 30, 1844 – May 26, 1902) was a Republican member of the U.S. House of Representatives from Pennsylvania.

Henry C. McCormick was born in Washington Township, Lycoming County, Pennsylvania.  He attended the common schools and Dickinson Seminary in Williamsport, Pennsylvania.  He studied law, was admitted to the bar in 1866 and practiced in Williamsport.

McCormick was elected as a Republican to the Fiftieth and Fifty-first Congresses.  He served as chairman of the United States House Committee on Railways and Canals during the Fifty-first Congress.  He was a delegate to the 1892 Republican National Convention.  He was elected president of the Williamsport & North Branch Railroad in 1892.  He served as attorney general of Pennsylvania from 1895 to 1899.  He resumed the practice of law and died in Williamsport in 1902.  His body is interred at Wildwood Cemetery.

Sources 
 
 The Political Graveyard

1844 births
1902 deaths
Pennsylvania lawyers
Politicians from Williamsport, Pennsylvania
Pennsylvania Attorneys General
People from Lycoming County, Pennsylvania
Republican Party members of the United States House of Representatives from Pennsylvania
19th-century American politicians